Sri Lanka Navy Sports Club or Navy SC may refer to:

  Sri Lanka Navy Sports Club (cricket)
  Sri Lanka Navy Sports Club (football)
  Sri Lanka Navy Sports Club (rugby)